Acupalpus partiarius is a species of ground beetles in the family Carabidae. It is found in North America.

References

 Bousquet, Yves (2012). "Catalogue of Geadephaga (Coleoptera, Adephaga) of America, north of Mexico". ZooKeys, issue 245, 1–1722.
of America North of Mexico". Memoirs of the Entomological Society of Canada, no. 167, 397.
 Larochelle, André, and Marie-Claude Larivière (2003). A Natural History of the Ground-Beetles (Coleoptera: Carabidae) of America north of Mexico, 583.

Further reading

 Arnett, R.H. Jr., and M. C. Thomas. (eds.). (2000). American Beetles, Volume I: Archostemata, Myxophaga, Adephaga, Polyphaga: Staphyliniformia. CRC Press LLC, Boca Raton, FL.
 Arnett, Ross H. (2000). American Insects: A Handbook of the Insects of America North of Mexico. CRC Press.
 Richard E. White. (1983). Peterson Field Guides: Beetles. Houghton Mifflin Company.

partiarius
Beetles described in 1823